"It's All Gone" is a song by British singer-songwriter Chris Rea that was released in 1986 as the lead single from his eighth studio album On the Beach. It was written by Rea, and produced by Rea and David Richards. "It's All Gone" reached No. 69 in the UK Singles Chart and remained in the Top 100 for four weeks.

Music video
The song's music video was directed by Tony van den Ende. Speaking to Guitarist in 1986 about the upcoming video shoot, Rea revealed: "It's going to be a Spaghetti western! The band doesn't look like Depeche Mode and to dress us up would make us look absolutely stupid. As we already look as if we had just crawled from underneath the saloon, I suggested we make a video that exaggerates the fact!"

Critical reception
On its release, Music & Media picked "It's All Gone" as a "sure hit" and described it as a "medium-paced rock song". In a review of On the Beach, Robin Denselow of The Guardian commented: "It's a classy album, but for the British market he might have included more up-tempo pieces like "It's All Gone", a moodily stirring song of decay."

Track listing
7" single
 "It's All Gone" – 4:10
 "Bless Them All" – 2:28

7" single (UK special double pack)
 "It's All Gone" – 4:10
 "Bless Them All" – 2:28
 "Stainsby Girls" – 3:50
 "And When She Smiles" – 3:12

12" single
 "It's All Gone" – 6:46
 "Crack That Mould" – 4:41
 "Bless Them All" – 2:28

Personnel
Production
 Chris Rea - producer
 David Richards - producer, mixing

Charts

References

1986 songs
1986 singles
Magnet Records singles
Chris Rea songs
Songs written by Chris Rea